The Pussycat Dolls are an American girl group who have received various awards and nominations, including, two MTV Video Music Awards and a NRJ Music Award, in addition to receiving Grammy Award and Brit Award nominations.

Their debut single "Don't Cha" propelled them to international success in 2005 and earned them a Billboard R&B/Hip-Hop Award for Hot R&B/Hip-Hop Songs Sales while its music video won Best Video at the Smash Hits Poll Winners Party. Their debut studio album, PCD (2005) was recognized as Best International Album at the 2006 TMF Awards and spawned five more singles including "Stickwitu" which was nominated for a Grammy Award for Best Pop Performance by a Duo or Group with Vocals at the 2007 ceremony and "Buttons". Its music video received two nominations at the 2006 MTV Video Music Awards, winning Best Dancing in a Video. That same year, they received Best Group nominations at the American Music Awards, the MOBO Awards and the MTV Europe Music Awards and a Brit Award nomination for International Breakthrough Act.

In 2008, the group released their second and final studio album, Doll Domination which includes lead single "When I Grow Up". Its music video received six nominations, including Video of the Year at the 2008 MTV Video Music Awards, winning Best Dancing in a Video. The following year, the Pussycat Dolls received the International Duo/Group of the Year award at the NRJ Music Awards.

Awards and nominations

Notes

References

External links 

 Official Website

Awards
Lists of awards received by American musician
Lists of awards received by musical group